Sergey Bogdanov (born 5 May 1983) is a Uzbekistani rower. He competed in the men's lightweight double sculls event at the 2004 Summer Olympics.

References

1983 births
Living people
Uzbekistani male rowers
Olympic rowers of Uzbekistan
Rowers at the 2004 Summer Olympics
People from Sirdaryo Region
Rowers at the 2006 Asian Games
Asian Games competitors for Uzbekistan
21st-century Uzbekistani people